Tin Can Beach can refer to:

A nickname for a section of Bolsa Chica State Beach, California
A nickname for a section of Huntington State Beach, California
A 1968 single by The Bonniwell Music Machine

See also
Tin Can Bay, Queensland